Steel Division: Normandy 44 is a real-time strategy video game developed by Eugen Systems and published by Paradox Interactive, set in World War II.

Setting 
The game takes place in Normandy, France during the Second World War. It depicts the battles fought between the Allies and Germany, as the Allies push out of their invasion beachheads following the Normandy landings. A wide variety of military forces are represented, including those of Canada, Germany, France, Poland, the United Kingdom, and the United States.

Gameplay 
Players take control of historical units, based on the divisions that fought during the fighting in Normandy, and then choose from a set of units before the start of a match. Once the game is underway, the player can call in units from the selected deck. The matches are sub-divided into three phases, with more powerful units only becoming available after a certain point in the game. Steel Division: Normandy 44 features three single player campaigns, and up to 10v10 online multiplayer battles.

Sequel 
A sequel was announced on July 25, 2018. Entitled Steel Division 2, the game is set during Operation Bagration.

References

External links 
 

Real-time strategy video games
Strategy video games
World War II video games
2017 video games
Windows games
Windows-only games
Paradox Interactive games
Video games developed in France
Video games set in France